Secrets (Estonian: Saladused) is an Estonian television drama series created by Tuuli Roosma. Each story is made by different directors, such as Anri Rulkov, Arbo Tammiksaar, Rando Pettai, Marianne Kõrver, Ergo Kuld, Jan-Erik Nõgisto, Rain Tolk.

Show recovers the Estonian people relationship dramas and scandals.

Tuuli Roosma's presented series brings out the big mysteries of ordinary people in Estonia, and a staggering relationship dramas in sillier adventures. It is exclusively true-life stories with real people behind. Their privacy interests TV series uses real actors and actresses for big screen production.

Its premiere was on Kanal 2 on 31 March 2008.

See also
List of Secrets episodes

Estonian television series
2008 Estonian television series debuts
2000s Estonian television series
2010s Estonian television series
2008 in Estonian television
Kanal 2 original programming